Next Gen Publishing is an Indian publishing company. It was created in 2005 by its parent companies Forbes Group, a subsidiary of Shapoorji Pallonji Group, and HDFC Bank. Hoshang Billimoria was CEO of the newly created company.

Publications
Next Gen publishes a number of English language magazines for Indian readers including:
Bike India 
Car India 
T3
Smart Photography 
Mother and Baby 
The Ideal Home & Garden 
CV
Auto Components India
Power Watch

References

External links

Magazine publishing companies of India
Indian companies established in 2005
Publishing companies established in 2005
Mass media in Mumbai